Canjilón Mountain is a . mountain approximately six miles northeast of the village of Canjilón, in the Carson National Forest.

The word cajilon is the term for "deer antler" in Northern New Mexican Spanish. The mountain was so named because of its resemblance to an antler. The mountain gave its name to the nearby creek (Canjilon Creek), to the nearby lakes (Canjilon lakes), and to the village of Canjilon.

Canjilón Mountain was the site of a 3.7 magnitude earthquake on June 4, 2008.

References

Mountains of New Mexico
Landforms of Rio Arriba County, New Mexico
Mountains of Rio Arriba County, New Mexico